For Every Heart may refer to:

For Every Heart (Jamala album), 2011
For Every Heart (Twila Paris album), 1988
For Every Heart, a 1984 album by Diane Reeves